

The Men's Individual W2 archery competition at the 2004 Summer Paralympics was held from 21 to 25 September at the Olympic Baseball Centre (Athens).

The event was won by Mario Oehme, representing .

Results

Ranking Round

Competition bracket

[1] Decided by additional arrows: 8:5

References

M